Philip McCord Morse (August 6, 19035 September 1985), was an American physicist, administrator and pioneer of operations research (OR) in World War II. He is considered to be the father of operations research in the U.S.

Biography 
Morse graduated from the Case School of Applied Science in 1926 with a B.S. in physics. He earned his Ph.D. in physics from Princeton University in 1929. In 1930, he was granted an International Fellowship, which he used to do postgraduate study and research at the Ludwig Maximilian University of Munich under Arnold Sommerfeld during the winter of 1930 to the spring of 1931.

From the spring through the summer of 1931, he was at Cambridge University.  Upon return to the United States, he joined the faculty of MIT.

In 1949 he was named the first Research Director of the Weapons Systems Evaluation Group (WSEG), an organization founded to conduct studies for the Joint Chiefs of Staff, where he served a year and a half before returning to MIT in the summer of 1950. In 1956 he launched MIT’s Operations Research Center, directing it until 1968, and awarding the first Ph.D. in OR in the U.S. to John Little.

He was a member of a National Research Council committee dedicated to bringing OR into civilian life, and was a prime mover behind the creation of the Operations Research Society of America (ORSA) in 1952. He served as president of the American Physical Society, president of the Acoustical Society of America (ASA), and board chair of the American Institute of Physics.

In 1946, he was a recipient of the Medal for Merit from the U.S. President for his work during the war. In 1973 the ASA awarded him the Gold Medal, its highest award, for his work on vibration.

Work

Operations research 
Philip Morse made many contributions to the development of operations research (OR). Early in 1942 he organized the Anti-Submarine Warfare Operations Research Group (ASWORG), later ORG, for the U.S. Navy, after the US had entered World War II and was faced with the problem of Nazi German U-boat attacks on transatlantic shipping. "That Morse’s group was an important factor in winning the war is fairly obvious to everyone who knows anything about the inside of the war," wrote historian John Burchard.

Philip Morse co-authored Methods of Operations Research, the first OR textbook in the U.S., with George E. Kimball based on the Navy work. His further writings include the influential books Queues, Inventories, and Maintenance and Library Effectiveness. He received ORSA's Lanchester Prize in 1968 for the latter book.

Philip Morse gave the opening address at the 1957 organizing meeting of the International Federation of Operational Research Societies (IFORS). In 1959 he chaired the first NATO advisory panel on OR.

Physics 
Philip Morse had a distinguished career in physics. Amongst his contributions to physics are the textbooks Quantum Mechanics (with Edward Condon), Methods of Theoretical Physics (with Herman Feshbach), Vibration and Sound, Theoretical Acoustics, and Thermal Physics. Morse is also one of the founding editors of Annals of Physics. In 1929 he proposed the Morse potential function for diatomic molecules which was often used to interpret  vibrational spectra, though the standard is now the more modern Morse/Long-range potential.

Administration 
His administrative talents were applied in roles as co-founder of the MIT Acoustics Laboratory, first director of the Brookhaven National Laboratory, founder and first director of the MIT Computation Center, and board member of the RAND Corporation and the Institute for Defense Analyses.

He chaired the advisory committee that supervised preparation of Handbook of Mathematical Functions, with Formulas, Graphs, and Mathematical Tables, commonly known as Abramowitz and Stegun.

Publications 
 1945. Methods of Operations Research
 Queues, Inventories, and Maintenance and Library Effectiveness
 Quantum Mechanics. With Edward Condon.
 Methods of Theoretical Physics with Herman Feshbach.
 Vibration and Sound.
 Theoretical Acoustics with K. Uno Ingard.
 Thermal Physics
 1977. In at the Beginnings: A Physicist's Life.  Cambridge, Massachusetts: MIT Press, 1977.

References

External links 

 Official website
 
 
 Biography of Philip Morse from the Institute for Operations Research and the Management Sciences

American operations researchers
1903 births
1985 deaths
Medal for Merit recipients
Brookhaven National Laboratory staff
Massachusetts Institute of Technology faculty
Princeton University alumni
20th-century American physicists
ASA Gold Medal recipients
Fellows of the American Academy of Arts and Sciences
Fellows of the American Physical Society
Presidents of the American Physical Society